Četež pri Strugah is a small settlement in the Municipality of Dobrepolje in Slovenia. The area is part of the historical region of Lower Carniola. The municipality is now included in the Central Slovenia Statistical Region.

Name
The name of the settlement was changed from Četež to Četež pri Strugah in 1953.

References

External links
Četež pri Strugah on Geopedia

Populated places in the Municipality of Dobrepolje